Nyakyusa, or Nyakyusa-Ngonde, is a Bantu language of Tanzania and Malawi spoken by the Nyakyusa people around the northern end of Lake Malawi. There is no single name for the language as a whole; its dialects are Nyakyusa, Ngonde (Konde), Kukwe, Mwamba (Lungulu), and Selya (Salya, Seria) of Tanzania. Disregarding the Bantu language prefixes Iki- and Ki-, the language is also known as Konde ~ Nkhonde, Mombe, Nyekyosa ~ Nyikyusa, and Sochile ~ Sokili.

Sukwa is often listed as another dialect; however, according to Nurse (1988) and Fourshey (2002), it is a dialect of Lambya.

In Malawi, Nyakusa and Kyangonde are spoken in the northern part of Karonga District, on the shore of Lake Malawi, close to the border with Tanzania, while Nkhonde is spoken the centre of the district, including in the town of Karonga.

According to the Language Mapping Survey for Northern Malawi, carried out by the Centre for Language Studies of the University of Malawi, "Nyakyuska, though spoken by very few people, mainly at Iponga in Sub T/ A Mwakawoko’s area, is regarded as the parent language from which Kyangonde and Chinkhonde originated. Kyangonde, on the other hand, is regarded as the most prestigious and standard language/dialect of the district. ... Chinkhonde is seen as a dialect of Kyangonde which has been heavily influenced by Citumbuka."

The same Survey contains a folktale (the Tortoise and the Hare) in Chinkhonde and other languages of Northern Malawi, as well as some comparative vocabulary.

Below is the Tortoise and the Hare folktale in Chinkhonde.

Sample text from Bible

Mwalululu, Yehova ikwisa kutwabula ku nifwa, kangi inifwa yitisa kuyako bwila na bwila!

Translation

Very soon, Jehovah will free all humans from death, and death will be gone forever!

Writing system

Further reading  
Bastian Persohn (2017). The Verb in Nyakyusa: A focus on tense, aspect, and modality. Berlin: Language Science Press. http://langsci-press.org/catalog/book/141.  . DOI 10.5281/zenodo.926408. Open Access.

References

Languages of Tanzania
Languages of Malawi
Rukwa languages